Trio is a public art work by artist George Sugarman on permanent display at the Lynden Sculpture Garden near Milwaukee, Wisconsin and the Empire State Plaza in Albany, New York. The aluminum sculpture is painted bright yellow and consists of a series of abstract loops.

References

1972 sculptures
Outdoor sculptures in Milwaukee
Aluminum sculptures in Wisconsin
1972 establishments in Wisconsin